Raphitoma suberinacea is an extinct species of sea snail, a marine gastropod mollusc in the family Raphitomidae.

Description

Distribution
Fossils of this extinct marine species were found in Oligocene strata in Southwest France.

References

 Lozouet P. (2017). Les Conoidea de l'Oligocène supérieur (Chattien) du bassin de l'Adour (Sud-Ouest de la France). Cossmanniana. 19: 3–180. page(s): 62–63, pl. 28 figs 18–19, pl. 29 figs 1-6

suberinacea
Gastropods described in 2017